Chlaeniini is a tribe of ground beetles in the family Carabidae. There are more than 20 genera and 1,000 described species in Chlaeniini, found worldwide. The genus Chlaenius has more than 900 species.

Genera
These 22 genera belong to the tribe Chlaeniini:

 Actodus Alluaud, 1915
 Callistomimus Chaudoir, 1872
 Callistus Bonelli, 1810
 Chlaenius Bonelli, 1810
 Eccoptomenus Chaudoir, 1850
 Ectenognathus Murray, 1858
 Globulipalpus Sciaky & Facchini, 2019
 Harpaglossus Motschulsky, 1858
 Hololeius LaFerté-Sénectère, 1851
 Holosoma Semenov, 1889
 Mirachlaenius Facchini, 2011
 Parachlaenius Kolbe, 1894
 Perissostomus Alluaud, 1930
 Procletodema Péringuey, 1898
 Procletus Péringuey, 1896
 Rhopalomelus Boheman, 1848
 Sphodroschema Alluaud, 1930
 Stenoodes Basilewsky, 1953
 Straneomelus Sciaky & Facchini, 2019
 Stuhlmannium Kolbe, 1894
 Viridagonum Lassalle, 2015
 † Rhopalochlaenius Zhang; Sun & Zhang, 1994

References

Licininae